Aalborg Handball is a handball club from Aalborg, Denmark that competes in the Danish Handball League. Aalborg Håndbold play their home games in the Gigantium arena in Aalborg – known as Jutlander Bank Arena for sponsorship reasons. 

Aalborg Håndbold has won 6 Danish Championships and 2 Danish Cup. In 2021 they reached the final in the EHF Champions League.

History
In 2000 Aalborg Boldspilklub overtook the licence of the club Aalborg HSH. AaB Håndbold was owned by AaB A/S. AaB Håndbold won the Danish Championship in 2010 with a final victory of 2–1 in matches against KIF Kolding after six free throws in the free throw competition in match 3. 

In January 2011 the license was given to a new company called "Aalborg Håndbold A/S" and the team changed name to Aalborg Håndbold. Behind the new company are the businessman Eigild B. Christensen and director Jan Larsen, who both are from Aalborg. Aalborg Håndbold won the Danish Championship in 2013 with an overall 11-goal victory over KIF Kolding Copenhagen. 

In 2014 Aalborg got a second place, and also qualified for the Champions League 1/16 final, where Aalborg was defeated in two matches against FC Barcelona. Aalborg's success continued in 2015 with another Champions League 1/16 final. Again the opponent was FC Barcelona and again Aalborg was knocked out. 

In 2017 Aalborg won the Danish Championship for a third time and in 2019, 2020 and 2021 they won the Danish Championship 3 times in a row. In 2021 Aalborg also reached the final of the EHF Champions League becoming the only Danish and Nordic men's team to have done so. In the final Aalborg once again lost to FC Barcelona.

Kits

Accomplishments Men
Danish Handball League: 6 
: 2010, 2013, 2017, 2019, 2020, 2021
: 2014, 2022
Danish Handball Cup: 2
: 2018, 2021
: 2011, 2020
Danish Super Cup: 5
: 2012, 2019, 2020, 2021, 2022
: 2013, 2014
 EHF Champions League:
: 2021
IHF Super Globe:
: 2021

Team

Current squad
Squad for the 2022–23 season

Goalkeeper
 1  Simon Gade
 16  Mikael Aggefors
Wingers
LW
 3  Andreas Væver
 6  Sebastian Barthold
 23  Buster Juul 
RW
 19  Kristian Bjørnsen
 20  Andreas Flodman 
Line players
 2  Benjamin Jakobsen
 8  Jesper Nielsen 
 22  René Antonsen (c)

Back players
LB
 5  Victor Kløve
 21  Henrik Møllgaard
 24  Mikkel Hansen 
CB
 4  Aron Pálmarsson
 7  Felix Claar
RB
 11  Lukas Sandell 
 14  Mads Hoxer Hangaard
 17  Martin Larsen 
 26  Christian Termansen

Technical staff
Staff for the 2022–23 season

 Head Coach:  Stefan Madsen
 Assistant Coach:  Arnór Atlason
 Team Leader:  Torbjørn Christensen
 Team Leader:  Christian Müller
 Physical Trainer:  Kim Lynge
 Team Physician:  Jørgen Boserup

Transfers
Transfers for the 2023–24 season

Joining
  Simon Dahl (assistant coach) (from  Nordsjælland Håndbold)
  Niklas Landin Jacobsen (GK) (from  THW Kiel)
  Fabian Norsten (GK) (from  VfL Gummersbach) 
  Marinus Munk (LB) (Promoted to first team)
  Lukas Nilsson (LB) (from  Rhein-Neckar Löwen) 
  Thomas Sommer Arnoldsen (CB) (from  Skanderborg Aarhus Håndbold)
  Aleks Vlah (CB) (from  RK Celje)
  Patrick Wiesmach (RW) (from  SC Leipzig)
  Simon Hald (P) (from  SG Flensburg-Handewitt)

Leaving
  Arnór Atlason (assistant coach) (to  TTH Holstebro)
  Simon Gade (GK) (to  TSV Hannover-Burgdorf)
  Andreas Væver (LW) (to ?)
  Felix Claar (CB) (to  SC Magdeburg)
  Aron Pálmarsson (CB) (to  FH)  
  Lukas Sandell (RB) (to  Telekom Veszprém)
  Andreas Flodman (RW) (to  Frisch Auf Göppingen)

Notable former players

 Joachim Boldsen (2007–2008)
 Jannick Green (2008–2011)
 Mads Christiansen (2008–2011, 2019–2021)
 Henrik Møllgaard (2009–2012, 2018–)
 Martin Larsen (2005–2018)
 Jacob Bagersted (2011–2014)
 Henrik Toft Hansen (2006–2011)
 Mads Mensah Larsen (2012–2014)
 Søren Rasmussen (2003–2010)
 Rune Ohm (2003–2006)
 Jesper Meinby (2017–2019)
 Simon Hald Jensen (2013–2018, 2023–)
 Magnus Saugstrup (2014–2021)
 Mikkel Hansen (2022–)
 Isaías Guardiola (2014–2015)
 Janus Daði Smárason (2017–2020)
 Ómar Ingi Magnússon (2018–2020)
 Stefán Rafn Sigurmannsson (2016–2017)
 Kristian Kjelling (2009–2013)
 Ole Erevik (2011–2015)
 Håvard Tvedten (2002–2006, 2011–2016)
 Børge Lund (2002–2006)
 Kjetil Strand (2006–2007)
 Sander Sagosen (2014–2017)
 Kristian Sæverås (2018–2020)
 André Jørgensen (2006–2009)
 Johan Sjöstrand (2012–2013)
 Andreas Palicka (2015–2016)
 Jonas Larholm (2008–2012)
 Johan Jakobsson (2011–2014)
 Jan Lennartsson (2007–2013)
 Felix Claar (2020–2023)
 Lukas Sandell (2020–2023)
 Lovro Jotić (2017–2018)

European Handball

EHF Champions League

Retired numbers

References

External links

Handball
Danish handball clubs
Sport in Aalborg